Harry Potter (roller coaster) may refer to multiple roller coasters themed to Harry Potter:

Dragon Challenge: an inverted dueling roller coaster formerly at Universal's Islands of Adventure
Flight of the Hippogriff: a junior roller coaster at Universal Parks
Hagrid's Magical Creatures Motorbike Adventure: a launched roller coaster at Universal's Islands of Adventure
Harry Potter and the Escape from Gringotts: an enclosed launched roller coaster at Universal Studios Florida